Hitchin' Posts is a 1920 American drama film directed by John Ford. It is considered to be a lost film.

Plot
As described in a film magazine, Jefferson Todd (Mayo) and Louis Castiga (Harris), brothers-in-law, come to blows on a Mississippi River steamer when Todd discovers Castiga's presence there with a woman usurping the place of his wife, Todd's sister. Todd, a Southern gentleman whose fortune was depleted during the Civil War, is attempting to rebuild it by gambling on the river boats that frequent the great river. He wins four race horses at poker with Colonel Brereton (Fenton), but refuses to collect the stakes. Brereton insists, and then takes his own life. Brereton's suicide causes Todd to question his new profession. Todd and Castiga again meet at the plantation home of the Colonel's daughter Barbara (Burnham), both having gone there to break the news of her father's death. Castiga's wiliness makes Barbara believe that Todd is an intruder and the cause of her father's ruin. The trouble between the men results in a duel in which Castiga cheats and is driven out of town. Barbara's faith in Todd is established and together they join the great army of homesteaders and go West for the great land lottery that followed the Civil War. They win a race for a homestead involving prairie schooners, buckboards, horse teams, and race horses, but fall victims to a plot hatched by Castiga. In a struggle between the two, Todd is victorious while his enemy meets his death. Love beckens for Todd and Barbara.

Cast
 Frank Mayo as Jefferson Todd
 Beatrice Burnham as Barbara Brereton
 C.E. Anderson as Captain of steamer
 Matthew Biddulph as Major Grey (credited as M. Biddulph)
 Mark Fenton as Colonel Brereton
 Dagmar Godowsky as Octoroon
 Joe Harris as Louis Castiga
 Duke R. Lee as Colonel Lancy (credited as Duke Lee)
 J. Farrell MacDonald as Joe Alabam (credited as J. Farrell McDonald)

See also
List of lost films

References

External links

1920 films
1920 drama films
American silent feature films
Silent American drama films
American Civil War films
American black-and-white films
Films directed by John Ford
Lost American films
Universal Pictures films
1920 lost films
Lost drama films
1920s American films